Hummin’ to Myself  is the twenty-fourth studio album by American singer, songwriter, and producer Linda Ronstadt. The album debuted at #3 on the Billboard Top Jazz Albums chart where it remained for six months.  It peaked at #166 on the main Billboard album chart. It was her final solo album before her retirement in 2011, though she would record one more collaborative album in 2006 titled Adieu False Heart.

History
Hummin' to Myself represents a return by Ronstadt to the classic jazz standards world she explored in a series of 1980s albums with Nelson Riddle, only this time with a band, not an orchestra, and in an overtly jazz manner. According to an interview with Ronstadt, the songs on the album were among those she wanted to record with Riddle, but was unable to because of his death.

Ronstadt sings songs by Frank Loesser (“Never Will I Marry” and “I’ve Never Been in Love Before”) and Cole Porter (“Get out of Town,” “Miss Otis Regrets), and “I Fall in Love Too Easily”.

Hummin’ to Myself received critical acclaim for its devotion to authenticity. It features musicians Alan Broadbent, Christian McBride, David “Fathead” Newman, Lewis Nash, Peter Erskine and Roy Hargrove.

Track listing

Personnel

 Linda Ronstadt – vocals, arrangements
 Warren Bernhardt – piano
 Alan Broadbent – piano, arrangements 
 Larry Koonse – guitar
 Bob Mann – guitar
 Trey Henry – bass
 Christian McBride – bass
 Lewis Nash – drums
 Peter Erskine – drums
 John Catchings – cello
 Roberta Cooper – cello
 Eugene Drucker – violin
 Daniel Block – clarinet
 Jim Horn – saxophone
 David "Fathead" Newman – saxophone
 Bob Sheppard – saxophone
 Roy Hargrove – flugelhorn
 Mike Haynes – flugelhorn
 Steven Bernstein – trumpet
 Jon-Erik Kellso – trumpet

Production
 George Massenburg – producer, engineer, mastering, mixing
 John Boylan – producer
 Al Schmitt – engineer
 Steve Bishir – assistant engineer
 Jim Brady – assistant engineer
 Mark DeBuck – assistant engineer
 Steve Genewick – assistant engineer
 Hank Linderman – assistant engineer
 Chris Powers – assistant engineer
 Sean Price – assistant engineer
 Dann Thompson – assistant engineer
 André Zweers – assistant engineer
Doug Sax – mastering
 Robert Hadley – mastering
 Isabelle Wong – graphic design
 Hollis King – art direction
 Rocky Schenck – photography

References

2004 albums
Linda Ronstadt albums
Albums produced by John Boylan (record producer)
Verve Records albums
Albums produced by George Massenburg